Tafsir Safi (full name: al-Safi fi Tafsir Kalam Allah al-Wafi) is an exegesis of the Qur'an written by 17th century Shia scholar Mohsen Fayz Kashani. This commentary on the Qur'an, may also be classified as a work on hadith, for it consists largely of citations from the Twelve Imams. It belongs to an era when most tafsirs relied "heavily on polemical hadith tradition buttressed by the accumulated wealth of hagiography and the euphoria of power after a long history of frustration" imposed on the Shias.

References

Shia tafsir